Susan McComas (born April 3, 1951) is a member of the Maryland House of Delegates representing District 34B in Harford County.  She was first elected to the House of Delegates in 2002, representing District 35B and Cecil County.

Education
McComas graduated from Johns Hopkins University in 1974 with a Bachelor of Arts in social & behavioral sciences.  She attended graduate school at the University of Colorado, majoring in Public Affairs.  She returned to college to get her law degree from the University of Wyoming College of Law, in 1980. She was admitted to Wyoming Bar in 1980 and the Maryland Bar 1981.

Career
Prior to law school, McComas served in various positions in Wyoming, first as a file clerk for the Wyoming House of Representatives in 1977. She also served as an administrative assistant for the Community Action of Laramie County, WY in 1977. In 1978, she became a legal intern for the Wyoming Department of Health and Social Services. In 1979, she moved up to a legal researcher for the National Organization of Social Security Claimants' Representatives, Finally, she served as an intern for Legal Services in Albany County, Wyoming from 1979 until 1980.

After law school, McComas practiced law at a private practice until 1983.  In 1984, she joined as an Associate at the Law Offices of Bruce J. Gilbert. Since 1985, she has been a sole practitioner. In 1989 and 1990, she served as the chair of the special committee on lawyer referral for the Maryland State Bar Association.  She has been a member of the Harford County Bar Association since 1983. She was a member of the Maryland Criminal Defense Attorneys' Association from 1986-88.  In Harford County, she was a member of Harford County Republican Central Committee from 1998-2002. She was also a member of the Maryland Municipal League (president, cecil/harford chapter, 1989–90), and a member of the legislative committee, from 1989 to 1992. McComas served on the Board of Directors for the Sexual Assault/Spouse Abuse Resource Center from 1982 until 1989. Finally, she has been a member of the Claims Committee, Local Government Insurance Trust, since 1996, serving as vice-chair since 2002.

As a member of the Maryland House of Delegates, she serves on the Judiciary Committee.

Legislative notes
 voted against the Clean Indoor Air Act of 2007 (HB359)
 voted against in-state tuition for illegal immigrants in 2007 (HB6)
 voted against the Healthy Air Act in 2006 (SB154)
 voted for slots in 2005 (HB1361)

Election results 
2002 Race for Maryland House of Delegates – District 35B
Voters to choose one:
{| class="wikitable"
|-
!Name
!Votes
!Percent
!Outcome
|-
|-
|Susan K. McComas, Rep.
|10,273
|  61.4%
|   Won
|-
|-
|David Carey, Dem.
|6,444
|  38.5%
|   Lost
|-
|Other Write-Ins 
|9
|  0.1%
|   
|-
|}

2006 Race for Maryland House of Delegates – District 35B
Voters to choose one:
{| class="wikitable"
|-
!Name
!Votes
!Percent
!Outcome
|-
|-
|Susan K. McComas, Rep.
|10,922
|  62.5%
|   Won
|-
|-
|David Carey, Dem.
|6,536
|  37.4%
|   Lost
|-
|Other Write-Ins 
|9
|  0.1%
|   
|-
|}

2010 Race for Maryland House of Delegates – District 35B
Voters to choose one:
{| class="wikitable"
|-
!Name
!Votes
!Percent
!Outcome
|-
|-
|Susan K. McComas, Rep.
|12,817
|  72.3%
|   Won
|-
|-
|John Janowich, Dem.
|4,884
|  27.6%
|   Lost
|-
|Other Write-Ins 
|24
|  0.1%
|   
|-
|}

2014 Race for Maryland House of Delegates – District 34B
Voters to choose one:
{| class="wikitable"
|-
!Name
!Votes
!Percent
!Outcome
|-
|-
|Susan K. McComas, Rep.
|11,801
|  72.7%
|   Won
|-
|-
|Cassandra R. Beverley, Dem.
|4,419
|  27.2%
|   Lost
|-
|Other Write-Ins 
|20
|  0.1%
|   
|-
|}

2018 Race for Maryland House of Delegates – District 34B
Voters to choose one:
{| class="wikitable"
|-
!Name
!Votes
!Percent
!Outcome
|-
|-
|Susan K. McComas, Rep.
|12,533
|  65.0%
|   Won
|-
|-
|Jeff Dinger, Dem.
|6,706
|  34.8%
|   Lost
|-
|Other Write-Ins 
|57
|  0.3%
|   
|-
|}

References and notes

External links
 http://www.msa.md.gov/msa/mdmanual/06hse/html/msa14001.html
 http://www.smccomas.com/smccomas.nsf/61ef4975ddb09cfa852570430046be4e/3856f2fd9d63e52b852571210067afe2!OpenDocument

People from Harford County, Maryland
1951 births
Republican Party members of the Maryland House of Delegates
Living people
Women state legislators in Maryland
Johns Hopkins University alumni
University of Colorado alumni
University of Wyoming College of Law alumni
21st-century American politicians
21st-century American women politicians